Oleksandr Olehovych Hodyniuk (born January 27, 1970), known commonly as Alexander Godynyuk is a Ukrainian former professional ice hockey defenceman. He was drafted in the sixth round, 115th overall, by the Toronto Maple Leafs in the 1990 NHL Entry Draft.

Career
Godynyuk played parts of five seasons in the Soviet Union before coming to North America to join the Maple Leaf organization. He made his NHL debut for Toronto in the 1990–91 season, appearing in 18 games. He played in 31 more games for the Maple Leafs in the 1991–92 season before being traded to the Calgary Flames in a ten-player deal which brought Doug Gilmour to Toronto.

Godynyuk was selected from the Flames by the Florida Panthers in the 1993 NHL Expansion Draft. He would move on to the Hartford Whalers midway through the 1993–94 season, and would stay there for the remainder of his NHL career.

Godynyuk left the NHL after the 1996–97 season. He played in the International Hockey League with the Chicago Wolves for one season, and then went to Europe to play in Switzerland's Nationalliga A and Germany's Deutsche Eishockey Liga before retiring following the 2000–01 season.

Godynyuk represented Ukraine at the 1999 IIHF World Championship.

In his NHL career, Godynyuk played in 223 games. He recorded ten goals and 39 assists.

He has two daughters named Elizabeth and Paulina.

Awards and honors
Directorate Award (Best Defenseman) and All-Star Selection, 1990 IIHF world junior hockey championships

Career statistics

Regular season and playoffs

International

References

External links
 
 

1970 births
Calgary Flames players
Chicago Wolves (IHL) players
Detroit Vipers players
Eisbären Berlin players
Florida Panthers players
Hartford Whalers players
Living people
Minnesota Moose players
Newmarket Saints players
Sportspeople from Kyiv
Salt Lake Golden Eagles (IHL) players
Sokil Kyiv players
Soviet expatriate ice hockey players
Soviet expatriate sportspeople in Canada
Soviet ice hockey defencemen
SC Bern players
Springfield Falcons players
Toronto Maple Leafs draft picks
Toronto Maple Leafs players
Ukraine men's national ice hockey team coaches
Ukrainian ice hockey defencemen
Ukrainian ice hockey coaches
Ukrainian expatriate sportspeople in Canada
Ukrainian expatriate sportspeople in the United States
Expatriate ice hockey players in the United States
Expatriate ice hockey players in Canada
Ukrainian expatriate sportspeople in Switzerland
Ukrainian expatriate ice hockey people
Expatriate ice hockey players in Switzerland
Expatriate ice hockey players in Germany
Ukrainian expatriate sportspeople in Germany